Hippoporella is a genus of bryozoans belonging to the family Hippoporidridae.

The genus has almost cosmopolitan distribution.

Species:

Hippoporella areolata 
Hippoporella bicornis 
Hippoporella castellana 
Hippoporella cornuta 
Hippoporella costulata 
Hippoporella distans 
Hippoporella fabianii 
Hippoporella fasigatoavicularis 
Hippoporella fastigatoavicularis 
Hippoporella filifera 
Hippoporella gibbera 
Hippoporella gigantea 
Hippoporella hippopus 
Hippoporella huziokai 
Hippoporella kurilensis 
Hippoporella labiata 
Hippoporella maderensis 
Hippoporella multiavicularia 
Hippoporella multilamellosa 
Hippoporella nitescens 
Hippoporella papulifera 
Hippoporella parva 
Hippoporella perforata 
Hippoporella pusilla 
Hippoporella rarepunctata 
Hippoporella rimata 
Hippoporella sabulonis 
Hippoporella spinosa 
Hippoporella testu 
Hippoporella ulvlifera
Hippoporella vincentae

References

Bryozoan genera